Kwon Soon-woo was the defending champion but chose not to defend his title.

Qualifier Li Tu won his first Challenger title, defeating Wu Yibing 7–6(7–5), 6–4 in the final.

Seeds

Draw

Finals

Top half

Bottom half

References

External links
Main draw
Qualifying draw

Seoul Open Challenger - 1
2022 Singles